Pangkalan Tebang is a former gold mining town in the Bau District, Kuching Division of Sarawak, Malaysia.

Gold was mined at Pangkalan Tebang since the early 19th century by Chinese miners.

Notes

Bau District
Towns in Sarawak